The 2001 Audi presents Petit Le Mans was the fourth running of this event.  It was the tenth and final round of the 2001 American Le Mans Series season as well as the seventh and final round of the 2001 European Le Mans Series season.  It took place at Road Atlanta, Georgia, on October 6, 2001.

Official results
Class winners in bold.

† - #33 MSB Motorsport, #3 Corvette Racing, and #37 Intersport Racing were all disqualified during the race for receiving outside assistance while still on the track.

Statistics
 Pole Position - #1 Audi Sport North America - 1:10.917
 Fastest Lap - #2 Audi Sport North America - 1:11.907
 Distance - 1610.567 km
 Average Speed - 173.816 km/h

External links
  
 World Sports Racing Prototypes - Race Results

Petit Le Mans
Petit Le Mans
Petit Le Mans
2001 in sports in Georgia (U.S. state)